Renu Kumari Yadav (Nepali: रेणु कुमारी यादव) (born 16 January 1959) is a Nepali politician and member of House of Representatives on proportional representation.

She most recently served as the Minister for Physical Infrastructure and Transportation of Nepal in the ruling coalition government led by Prime Minister and Nepali Congress President Sher Bahadur Deuba. Recently, Yadav resigned from the People's Socialist Party, Nepal.

Personal life 
Yadav was born on June 19, 1963, in Forbesganj, India to Rameshwor Prasad and Chintamani Devi Yadav. She belongs to the Ahir community.

Political life 
Yadav was elected as a Rastriya Prajatantra Party (RPP) candidate to the Pratinidhi Sabha in the 1999 election from the Saptari 3 constituency. In 2002 she was elected to the central committee of the RPP.

In June 2003, she was named Minister for Women, Children and Social Affairs in the Surya Bahadur Thapa-led cabinet appointed by King Gyanendra. When the RPP was divided and Thapa broke away and formed the Rastriya Janshakti Party, Yadav joined the new RJP.

In February 2008 she resigned from the parliament and left RJP, in support of the Madhesi agitation.

In April 2008, she won the Saptari 4 seat in the Constituent Assembly election as a Madhesi Janadhikar Forum candidate. In late May 2008, she was included in the central committee of MJF. She was subsequently appointed as Minister of Education and sworn in on August 22, 2008.

Controversies 

 Leading party split : As per trusted sources and national media's, Yadav wanted to split the with seven other MPs which included Bimal Prasad Shrivastav, Surendra Kumar Yadav, Mohammad Estiyak Rai, Pradeep Yadav, Umashankar Argariya, Kalu Devi Bishwakarma and Renuka Gurung. Though the plan went unsuccess do to last moment merger of Samajbadi Party, Nepal and Rastriya Janata Party Nepal to form People's Socialist Party, Nepal it was highly covered by national medias. 
 Gaur incident : Minister Yadav was shown black flag in Gaur, Rautahat on 20 January 2021 by farmers and party cadets of Janamat party led by CK Raut. After this incident, she said not to make a challenge else Raut and fellow farmers would be killed and that the incident of Gaur Rice mill would repeat when her party workers with Upendra Yadav present killed 28 Maoist workers led by Prabhu Sah trying to organize program on same field of rice mill.

Electoral history

2013 Constituent Assembly election

2008 Constituent Assembly election

1999 legislative elections

1994 legislative elections

References

Living people
Government ministers of Nepal
Rastriya Prajatantra Party politicians
Madhesi Jana Adhikar Forum, Nepal politicians
Women government ministers of Nepal
Nepal MPs 2017–2022
Nepal MPs 1999–2002
1963 births
Education ministers of Nepal
Members of the 1st Nepalese Constituent Assembly
Nepali Congress politicians from Madhesh Province
Rastriya Janashakti Party politicians
People's Socialist Party, Nepal politicians